Passion Dance is the fifth album by jazz singer Roseanna Vitro, released in January 1996 on the Telarc Jazz label.

Reception
"[A] superior set by a very appealing singer," writes AllMusic's Scott Yanow in his review of Vitro's Telarc debut. Commending Vitro as "a versatile vocalist who is not afraid to take chances," Yanow also cites the contributions of both pianist/musical director Kenny Werner and a roster of guest artists including "altoist Gary Bartz, trumpeter Tim Hagans, bassist Christian McBride and drummer Elvin Jones."

A contemporaneous review by Washington Post music critic Mike Joyce is similarly impressed:
A less talented singer might find herself intimidated by the company Vitro keeps on her new album. [...] Yet Vitro consistently holds her own on this diverse collection of standards and original compositions.  She conjures, by turns, the warmth, dizziness and passion of being in love.

Track listing
 "Out of This World" (Harold Arlen, Johnny Mercer) - 5:29
 "Long As You're Livin'" (Roseanna Vitro) - 6:16
 "Returned to Me (The Bird)" (Tex Allen) - 5:32
 "Freedom Jazz Dance" (Eddie Harris, Oscar Hammerstein II) - 5:18
 "For Heaven's Sake" (Sherman Edwards, Don Meyer, and Elise Bretton) - 5:03
 "Whisper Not" (Benny Golson, Leonard Feather) - 4:49
 "Simone" (Frank Foster, Cheryl Pyle) - 7:22
 "Blue Monk" (Thelonious Monk, Abbey Lincoln) - 5:14
 "Passion Dance" (McCoy Tyner, Roseanna Vitro) - 6:40
 "More Than You Know" (Vincent Youmans, Billy Rose, Edward Eliscu) - 7:19
 "Strollin' (Nostalgia in Times Square)" (Charles Mingus, George Gordon) - 5:19

Personnel
Vocals – Roseanna Vitro
Piano – Kenny Werner, Larry Willis
Bass – Christian McBride, Richie Goods, Ratzo Harris
Drums – Elvin Jones, Clarence Penn, Jamey Haddad
Guitar – Vic Juris, Romero Lubambo
Saxophone – Gary Bartz, Tim Ries
Guest vocalist – Kevin Mahogany

References

1996 albums
Roseanna Vitro albums